Cress Stuart Ingle (born December 27, 1947) is a Republican member of the New Mexico Senate, representing the 27th District since 1985. He served as minority leader for twenty years. Ingle is currently the most senior member of the New Mexico Senate.

References 

 Senator Stuart Ingle at the NM Senate website
 Project Vote Smart – Senator Stuart Ingle (NM) profile
 Follow the Money – Stuart Ingle
 2006 2004 2002 2000 1992 campaign contributions

1947 births
21st-century American politicians
American Presbyterians
Farmers from New Mexico
Living people
Republican Party New Mexico state senators
Oklahoma State University alumni
People from Clovis, New Mexico
People from Portales, New Mexico